Mogoro, Mòguru in sardinian language, is a comune (municipality) in the Province of Oristano in the Italian region Sardinia, located about  northwest of Cagliari and about  southeast of Oristano.

Mogoro borders the following municipalities: Collinas, Gonnostramatza, Masullas, Pabillonis, San Nicolò d'Arcidano, Sardara, Uras. Sights include the Romanesque-Gothic church of the Carmine, built in the early 14th century and the church of Sant'Antioco.

References

Cities and towns in Sardinia